There are at least 92 named trails in Sublette County, Wyoming according to the U.S. Geological Survey, Board of Geographic Names.  A trail is defined as: "Route for passage from one point to another; does not include roads or highways (jeep trail, path, ski trail)."

 Baldy Lake Trail, el.  
 Bell Lakes Trail, el.  
 Big Sunday Trail, el.  
 Bluff Creek Trail, el.  
 Boulder Basin Trail, el.  
 Boulder Canyon Trail, el.  
 Boundary Creek Trail, el.  
 Burnt Lake Trail, el.  
 Chilcoot Trail, el.  
 Clear Creek Trail, el.  
 Cook Lake Trail, el.  
 Cottonwood Trail, el.  
 Crossover Trail, el.  
 Crows Nest Trail, el.  
 Crows Nest Trail, el.  
 Diamond Lake Trail, el.  
 Doubletop Mountain Trail, el.  
 Dream Lake Trail, el.  
 Dutch Joe Larsen Creek Trail, el.  
 Elkhart Loop Ski Trail, el.  
 Emigrant Trail, el.  
 Emigrant Trail, el.  
 Emigrant Trail, el.  
 Emigrant Trail, el.  
 Europe Canyon Trail, el.  
 Fayette Cutoff Trail, el.  
 Fayette Lake Trail, el.  
 Firehole Trail, el.  
 Francis Lake Tail, el.  
 Fremont Trail, el.  
 Fremout Driveway, el.  
 Glimpse Lake Trail, el.  
 Grouse Mountain Ski Trail, el.  
 Hailey Pass Trail, el.  
 Half Moon Trail, el.  
 Halls Lake Trail, el.  
 Hay Pass Trail, el.  
 Heart Lake Trail, el.  
 High Line Trail, el.  
 Highline Trail, el.  
 Highline Trail, el.  
 Horseshoe Lake Trail, el.  
 Indian Pass Trail, el.  
 Jim Creek Trail, el.  
 Jim Lake Trail, el.  
 Lake Ethel Trail, el.  
 Lake Isabella Trail, el.  
 Lakeside Trail, el.  
 Little Half Moon Trail, el.  
 Little Sandy Trail, el.  
 Long Lake Trail, el.  
 Lowline Trail, el.  
 Lowline Trail, el.  
 Middle Fork Trail, el.  
 New Fork Canyon Trail, el.  
 New Fork Trail, el.  
 North Fork Trail, el.  
 Old Indian Trail, el.  
 Palmer Lake Trail, el.  
 Park Loop Ski Trail, el.  
 Pine Creek Canyon Trail, el.  
 Pole Creek Trail, el.  
 Porcupine Trail, el.  
 Pot Creek Trail, el.  
 Pyramid Lake Trail, el.  
 Roaring Fork Trail, el.  
 Ruff Lake Trail, el.  
 Sage Basin Trail, el.  
 Sawmill Park Trail, el.  
 Scab Creek Trail, el.  
 Scab Lake Trail, el.  
 Scab Sage Trail, el.  
 Section Corner Lake Trail, el.  
 Seneca Lake Trail, el.  
 Shadow Lake Trail, el.  
 Shannon Pass Trail, el.  
 Silver Lake Trail, el.  
 Slide Lake Trail, el.  
 Snake Lake Trail, el.  
 South Gypsum Trail, el.  
 Summit Lake Trail, el.  
 Surveyor Park Trail, el.  
 Sweeney Creek Trail, el.  
 Sylvan Lake Trail, el.  
 Timico Lake Trail, el.  
 Titcomb Basin Trail, el.  
 Trapper Lake Stock Trail, el.  
 Warm Springs Trail, el.  
 Wheeler Ranch Trail, el.  
 Willow Lake Trail, el.  
 Wyoming Range Trail, el.

See also

 List of trails in Wyoming
 Emigrant Trail in Wyoming

Notes

Geography of Sublette County, Wyoming
Historic trails and roads in Wyoming